Robert E. Dietz (born in New York in 1818) was the founder of the R. E. Dietz Company.

At the age of 22, he purchased a lamp and oil business at 62 Fulton Street in Brooklyn, New York. He manufactured candle lanterns. In 1842, he and his brother formed Dietz, Brother & Company. They were awarded the lighting contract for the P.T. Barnun premier of Jenny Lind in 1850 and they manufactured camphene lamps, solar lamps, girandoles, hall lamps and chandeliers.

In 1869, Robert Dietz formed the R. E. Dietz Company.

By the 1890s, he was the top lantern maker in the United States. He died in 1897.

References

1818 births
1897 deaths
American manufacturing businesspeople
Businesspeople from New York (state)
19th-century American businesspeople